, O/N 220421 (USSB 20-31), a Design 1013 ship built by Los Angeles Shipbuilding & Drydock Company in 1920.

Or SS Topa Topa may refer to one of two Type C2-S-E1 ships built by Gulf Shipbuilding for the United States Maritime Commission:

  (MC hull number 485), transferred to the United States Navy as the  USS Graffias (AF-29); scrapped in 1974
  (MC hull number 1610), scrapped in 1973

Ship names